Watan (Arabic: وطن) or Al-Watan with the definite article al- (Arabic: الوطن), meaning homeland, heimat, country, or nation, may refer to:

Politics
Al-Watan means 'national' in Arabic and in Persian (وطن), the articles titles on Wikipedia for political parties are sometimes translated as 'national', sometimes as 'al-watan', 'al-watani' or 'watani'. Wataniyya may also refer to State-based ('patriotic') nationalism (see Egyptian nationalism), as opposed to Qawmiyya, ethnic-based Arab nationalism
 Watani Party or Al-Watani Party, a former Egyptian party
 Homeland Party (Libya), or Al-Watan Party, a Libyan party
 National Party (Syria), or Al-Watani Party, a former Syrian party
 Al-Watan Party (Tunisia), or Al-Watan Party, a centrist party in Tunisia
 Watan Party of Afghanistan, an Afghan political party
 Vatan Party, a former Iranian party
 Patriotic Party (Turkey), a Turkish political party

Publications
It is commonly used as the name of Arabic-language newspapers, as well as newspapers in other languages that have borrowed the word:

 Al-Watan (Bahrain), an Arabic daily newspaper published in Bahrain
 Watan News, online Jordanian news agency
 Al-Watan (Kuwait), a Kuwaiti Arabic-language defunct daily published by the Al Watan publishing house
 Al-Watan Daily, a daily English-language newspaper published in Kuwait
 Alwatan (Oman), an Arabic daily newspaper published in Oman
 Al-Watan (Qatar), a daily morning Arabic-language political newspaper based in Doha, Qatar
 Al-Watan (Saudi Arabia), a daily newspaper in Saudi Arabia
 Al-Watan (Syria), a Syrian Arabic-language daily newspaper published in Syria
 Al-Watwan (Comoros), a Comorian French-language and Comorian Arabic-language daily newspaper published in Moroni, Comoros

 El Watan, an Algerian newspaper
 Nawai Watan, a Balochi newspaper in Pakistan
 Vatan, a Turkish daily newspaper, founded in 2002
 Vatan (former newspaper), former Turkish newspaper (1923–1925, 1940–1978)

Places
 Al-Watan, San‘a’, a village in western central Yemen
 Qasr Al Watan, the United Arab Emirates presidential palace and seat of government.

Other uses
 Watan (film), a 1938 Indian film
 Watan Group, a telecommunications and security company in Afghanistan
 Pader Watan, a military unit in the Soviet-backed Democratic Republic of Afghanistan
 Watan Order, the highest national order of Turkmenistan
 Watan, a historical land allotment in India owned by a Watandar
 Ardulfurataini (national anthem), national anthem of Iraq from 1981 to 2003

ar:الوطن